Insull is an unincorporated community and coal town in Harlan County, Kentucky.  Its post office is closed. It was also known as Fee.

References 

Unincorporated communities in Kentucky
Unincorporated communities in Harlan County, Kentucky
Coal towns in Kentucky